Attention Profiling Mark-up Language (APML) is an XML-based  markup language for documenting a person's interests and dislikes.

Overview
APML allows people to share their own personal attention profile in much the same way that OPML allows the exchange of reading lists between news readers. The idea behind APML is to compress all forms of attention data into a portable file format containing a description of the user's rated interests.

The APML Workgroup
The APML Workgroup is tasked with maintaining and refining the APML specification.  The APML Workgroup is made up of industry experts and leaders and was founded by Chris Saad and Ashley Angell. The workgroup allows public recommendations and input, and actively evangelises the public’s "Attention Rights".  The workgroup also adheres to the principles of Media 2.0 Best Practices.

Services
Services that have adopted APML
 Bloglines was an RSS reader. It was one of the major RSS readers on the web, with its main competitor being Google Reader. Bloglines announced it would support APML.
 OpenLink Data Spaces is a Distributed Collaborative Web Application Platform, Social Network and Content Management System.

Specifications
Specifications at apml.org

Example
Example taken from the APML wikisite.
<?xml version="1.0"?>
<APML xmlns="http://www.apml.org/apml-0.6" version="0.6" >
  <Head>
    <Title>Example APML file for apml.org</Title>
    <Generator>Written by Hand</Generator>
    <UserEmail>sample@apml.org</UserEmail>
    <DateCreated>2007-03-11T01:55:00Z</DateCreated>
  </Head>

  <Body defaultprofile="Work">
    <Profile name="Home">
      <ImplicitData>
        <Concepts>
          <Concept key="attention" value="0.99" from="GatheringTool.com" updated="2007-03-11T01:55:00Z" />
          <Concept key="content distribution" value="0.97" from="GatheringTool.com" updated="2007-03-11T01:55:00Z" />
          <Concept key="information" value="0.95" from="GatheringTool.com" updated="2007-03-11T01:55:00Z" />
          <Concept key="business" value="0.93" from="GatheringTool.com" updated="2007-03-11T01:55:00Z" />
          <Concept key="alerting" value="0.91" from="GatheringTool.com" updated="2007-03-11T01:55:00Z" />
          <Concept key="intelligent agents" value="0.89" from="GatheringTool.com" updated="2007-03-11T01:55:00Z" />
          <Concept key="development" value="0.87" from="GatheringTool.com" updated="2007-03-11T01:55:00Z" />
          <Concept key="service" value="0.85" from="GatheringTool.com" updated="2007-03-11T01:55:00Z" />
          <Concept key="user interface" value="0.83" from="GatheringTool.com" updated="2007-03-11T01:55:00Z" />
          <Concept key="experience design" value="0.81" from="GatheringTool.com" updated="2007-03-11T01:55:00Z" />
          <Concept key="site design" value="0.79" from="GatheringTool.com" updated="2007-03-11T01:55:00Z" />
          <Concept key="television" value="0.77" from="GatheringTool.com" updated="2007-03-11T01:55:00Z" />
          <Concept key="management" value="0.75" from="GatheringTool.com" updated="2007-03-11T01:55:00Z" />
          <Concept key="media" value="0.73" from="GatheringTool.com" updated="2007-03-11T01:55:00Z" />
        </Concepts>

        <Sources>
          <Source key="http://feeds.feedburner.com/apmlspec" name="APML.org" value="1.00" type="application/rss+xml" from="GatheringTool.com" updated="2007-03-11T01:55:00Z">
            <Author key="Sample" value="0.5" from="GatheringTool.com" updated="2007-03-11T01:55:00Z" />
          </Source>
        </Sources>
      </ImplicitData>

      <ExplicitData>
        <Concepts>
          <Concept key="direct attention" value="0.99" />
        </Concepts>
 
       <Sources>
          <Source key="http://feeds.feedburner.com/TechCrunch" name="Techcrunch" type="application/rss+xml" value="0.4">
            <Author key="ExplicitSample" value="0.5" />
          </Source>
        </Sources>
      </ExplicitData>
    </Profile>

    <Profile name="Work">

      <ImplicitData />

      <ExplicitData>
        <Concepts>
          <Concept key="Golf" value="0.2" />
        </Concepts>

        <Sources>
          <Source key="http://feeds.feedburner.com/TechCrunch" name="Techcrunch" type="application/atom+xml" value="0.4">
            <Author key="ProfessionalBlogger" value="0.5" />
          </Source>
        </Sources>
      </ExplicitData>
    </Profile>

    <Applications>
      <Application name="sample.com">
        <SampleAppEl />
      </Application>
    </Applications>

  </Body>
</APML>

See also
 Digital traces

References 

XML-based standards
XML markup languages